Corby Technical School is a co-educational secondary school located in Corby, Northamptonshire, England. It is a free school operated by Brooke Weston Trust. The Corby-based school also operates a sixth form for students 16–19.

References

External links
 
 OFSTED Inspection Report

Free schools in England
Secondary schools in North Northamptonshire